The spotted thrush-babbler (Illadopsis turdina) also known as the thrush babbler, is a species of bird in the family Pellorneidae. It is found in Angola, Cameroon, Central African Republic, Democratic Republic of the Congo, South Sudan, and Zambia. Its natural habitats are subtropical or tropical moist lowland forest and subtropical or tropical moist shrubland.

References

 Collar, N. J. & Robson, C. 2007. Family Timaliidae (Babblers) pp. 70–291 in; del Hoyo, J., Elliott, A. & Christie, D. A. eds. Handbook of the Birds of the World, Vol. 12. Picathartes to Tits and Chickadees. Lynx Edicions, Barcelona.

spotted thrush-babbler
Birds of Central Africa
spotted thrush-babbler
Taxonomy articles created by Polbot